A club sandwich, also called a clubhouse sandwich, is a sandwich consisting of bread (traditionally toasted), sliced cooked poultry, fried bacon, lettuce, tomato, and mayonnaise. 
It is often cut into quarters or halves and held together by cocktail sticks. Modern versions frequently have two layers which are separated by an additional slice of bread.

History
The club sandwich may have originated at the Union Club of New York City. The earliest known reference to the sandwich, an article that appeared in The Evening World on November 18, 1889, is also an early recipe: "Have you tried a Union Club sandwich yet? Two toasted pieces of Graham bread, with a layer of turkey or chicken and ham between them, served warm."  Several other early references also credit the chef of the Union Club with creating the sandwich.

Another theory is that the club sandwich was invented at the Saratoga Club in Saratoga Springs, New York, after Richard Canfield bought it and made it into the Canfield Casino in 1894. 

Other sources find the origin of the club sandwich to be up for debate.

The sandwich appeared on U.S. restaurant menus as early as 1899. The earliest reference to the sandwich in published fiction is from Conversations of a Chorus Girl, a 1903 book by Ray Cardell. Historically, club sandwiches featured slices of chicken, but with time, turkey has become increasingly common. An 1897 recipe has three layers, with the chicken and ham separated not by a slice of bread, but by a lettuce leaf.

Ingredients
As with a BLT, toasted white bread is standard, along with iceberg lettuce, bacon, and tomatoes. The sandwich is usually dressed with mayonnaise. Variations on the traditional club sandwich abound. Some replace the poultry meat with eggs (a "breakfast club") or roast beef. Others use ham instead of, or in addition to, bacon, or add slices of cheese. Various kinds of mustard and sliced pickles may be added.  Upscale variations include the oyster club, the salmon club, and Dungeness crab melt. 

In 2000, Burger King came under fire for its chicken club, which contained 700 calories, 44 grams of fat (nine of them saturated), and 1,300 milligrams of sodium, as well as the trans fat from the fryer shortening.

In New Zealand, 'club sandwich' refers to a tea (or finger) sandwich, typically filled with egg mayonnaise, lettuce and tomato.

See also

 Dagwood sandwich
 List of sandwiches

References

American sandwiches
Skewered foods
Turkey dishes
Chicken sandwiches